James Pomeroy (December 16, 1936 – April 8, 2016) was an American pastor in the United Methodist Church who served as a North Dakota Democratic-NPL Party member of the North Dakota Senate, representing the 27th district.

Early life and education
Pomeroy grew up in Fargo, where he graduated from Central High School. He earned Bachelor of Science and Master of Divinity degrees from North Dakota State University and a Doctor of Ministry degree from Drew University Theological School (which he attended with the other members of his high school singing quartet, The Uncalled Four), and also studied at McCormick Theological Seminary.

Church career
Pomeroy was ordained as an elder in the Methodist Church in 1961 and served as a pastor and administrator in North and South Dakota for 43 years until his retirement in 2002, including leading training meetings in the 1970s.

Political career
In 2006 Pomeroy defeated incumbent Richard Brown, a Republican, for a four-year term in the North Dakota Senate representing the 27th district. He served on committees including Health and Human Services and Judicial Processes. He declined to seek re-election.

Private life and death
Pomeroy was a cousin of Earl Pomeroy, who served in the United States House of Representatives. He and his wife Mavis, whom he married in 1971, had a daughter. He died in 2016 at the age of 79.

References

External links
North Dakota State Legislature - Senator Jim Pomeroy, North Dakota Senate. Archived on May 11, 2008.
Project Vote Smart - Senator Jim Pomeroy (ND) profile
2006 Senate campaign contributions, Follow the Money
North Dakota Democratic-NPL Party - Senator Jim Pomeroy profile

North Dakota state senators
1936 births
2016 deaths